Stigmata, bodily marks, sores, or sensations of pain in locations corresponding to the crucifixion wounds of Jesus

Stigmata may also refer to:

Music
 Stigmata (Russian band), a Russian metalcore band
 Stigmata (Sri Lankan band), a Sri Lankan heavy metal band
 Stigmata (record label), a German record label
 Stigmata (Arch Enemy album), a 1998 album by Swedish melodic death metal band Arch Enemy
 "Stigmata" (song), a single by industrial metal band Ministry from the 1988 album The Land of Rape and Honey
 "Stigmata", a single from the Finnish goth rock band The 69 Eyes
 "Stigmata", a single released by the Japanese band Rentrer en Soi
 “Stigmata”, a single released by the Philadelphia band Varials

Other uses
 Stigmata (medicine, chiefly in the plural stigmata), visible signs or characteristics of a medical condition.
 Stigmata (film), a 1999 movie produced by Frank Mancuso Jr.
 The Three Stigmata of Palmer Eldritch, a 1965 novel by Philip K. Dick
 Stigmata of the liver, a symptom of chronic liver disease
 Spiracle (arthropods), entrances to the respiratory system of some insects
 Stigmata, structures in the pharynx of a tunicate (animal)

See also
 Stigma (disambiguation)
 Stigmatines